Acreana is a genus of beetles in the family Cerambycidae, containing a single species, Acreana cuprea. It was described by Lane in 1973.

References

Calliini
Beetles described in 1973
Monotypic Cerambycidae genera